Roger Federer was the defending champion, and won in the final 6–0, 6–7(4–7), 6–2, against Tomáš Berdych.

Seeds

Draw

Finals

Top half

Bottom half

External links
 Singles draw
 Qualifying draw

Singles